The Assembly of French Polynesia (Tahitian: Te apo'ora'a rahi o te fenua Mā'ohi) is the unicameral legislature of French Polynesia, an overseas country of the French Republic. It is located at Place Tarahoi in Pape'ete, Tahiti. It was established in its current form in 1996 although a Tahitian Assembly was first created in 1824. It consists of 57 members who are elected by popular vote for five years; the electoral system is based upon proportional representation in six multi-seat constituencies. Every constituency is represented by at least three representatives. Since 2001, the parity bill binds that the number of women matches the number of men elected to the Assembly.

The official language of the Assembly is French. The most recent election was held in 2018 and resulted in a victory of the Tapura Huiraatira, which won 38 seats. Aside from passing legislation and scrutinising the government, the Assembly is responsible for electing the President of French Polynesia for a four-year term. The number of seats was changed from 49 to 57 on 23 May 2004, for the 2004 election. On 13 February 2005, by-elections for the Assembly were held in the constituency of the Windward Islands (circonscription des Îles du Vent). The next general election is scheduled in 2023.

Constituencies
The six electoral districts (circonscriptions électorales) are:

 electoral circumscription of the Windward Islands (circonscription des Îles du Vent) (37 members)
 electoral circumscription of the Leeward Islands (circonscription des Îles Sous-le-Vent) (8 members)
 electoral circumscription of the Austral Islands (circonscription des Îles Australes) (3 members)
 electoral circumscription of the Gambier Islands and the Islands Tuamotu-East (circonscription des Îles Gambier et Tuamotu Est) (3 members)
 electoral circumscription of the Islands Tuamotu-West (circonscription des Îles Tuamotu Ouest) (3 members)
 electoral circumscription of the Marquesas Islands (circonscription des Îles Marquises) (3 members)

President of the Assembly of French Polynesia

L’Assemblée représentative (1946-1953)

L’Assemblée territoriale (1953-1996)

L'Assemblée de la Polynésie française (After 1996)

Elections

References

External links 
 Official website of the Assembly of French Polynesia 
 Website of the Polynesian Presidency 
 Territorial legislative framework of French Polynesia 
 Polynesia Prefecture portal 

 
Politics of French Polynesia
Political organizations based in French Polynesia
Government of French Polynesia
French Polynesia
Legislatures of Overseas France